The 2nd constituency of Lozère (French: Deuxième circonscription de la Lozère) was a French legislative constituency in the Lozère département. It was abolished in the 2010 redistricting of French legislative constituencies, its last deputy was Pierre Morel-À-L'Huissier,
who also represented the one constituency for the whole department from the 2012 election onwards.

References

Defunct French legislative constituencies
French legislative constituencies of Lozère
2010 disestablishments in France